Part of a series of articles upon Archaeology of Kosovo

The Archaeological site at Poslishte is a cultural heritage monument located near Prizren, Kosovo. This monument was a Roman site of the Villa Rustica (Statio Mansio type) and is of the "Archaeological" category.

History 
The archaeological site in Poslishte was discovered during the construction of the highway segment between Prizren and Vrmica in 2010, approximately one kilometre south of the multilayer archaeological site at Vlashnja, on the left side of this road segment, respectively, 150 m from the road that leads toward the Poslište village. Rescue excavations were carried out at this location in an earlier known unidentified site of Roman era. 

Nevertheless, based on the discovered archaeological material, the archaeological excavations proved existence of the remains of a Roman road station, set along the ancient road Via Lissus-Naissus. Aside from the discovered movable archaeological material, within this archaeological complex, a Mansio with several secondary rooms with a conspicuous Thermae were recorded. Most likely, as part of the Roman road station a building known as Mutatio or horse exchange station was part of this complex. While, it is known that along the important Roman roads, there were station stables that served to offer fresh horses a service that was offered at each road station along the Roman roads during Roman period.

See also 
Dardanians
List of settlements in Illyria
Archaeology of Kosovo
Roman Period Sites in Kosovo
Neolithic Sites in Kosovo
Copper, Bronze and Iron Age Sites in Kosovo
Late Antiquity and Medieval Sites in Kosovo

References 

Illyrian Kosovo
Archaeology of Illyria
Dardanians
Moesia
Dardania (Roman province)
Roman towns and cities in Kosovo
Archaeological sites in Kosovo
Cultural heritage monuments in Prizren District